Hessigheim is a municipality in the Ludwigsburg district of Baden-Württemberg, Germany.

History
Hessigheim was first mentioned in 744 as a property of first Lorsch Abbey to Princely Abbey of Fulda. The town was pledged to the Electoral Palatinate in 1453, but was then militarily occupied in 1504 by the Duchy of Württemberg.

Geography
The municipality (Gemeinde) of Hessigheim is located in the district of Ludwigsburg, in Baden-Württemberg, one of the 16 States of the Federal Republic of Germany. Hessigheim is physically located in  the Neckar. Elevation above sea level in the municipal area ranges from a high of  Normalnull (NN) to a low of  NN.

Portions of the Federally protected  and Neckarhalde nature reserves are located in Hessigheim's municipal area.

Politics
Hessigheim has one borough (Ortsteil), Hessigheim, and two villages: Fasanenhof and Im Fetzer.

Coat of arms
Hessigheim's coat of arms shows a green grapevine with three clusters of blue grapes growing upon a hill split by a wavy white line, all upon a field of white. This coat of arms was awarded to Hessigheim with a municipal flag on 18 July 1979.

Transportation
Hessigheim is connected to Germany's network of roadways by its local Landesstraßen and Kreisstraßen. Local public transportation is provided by the Verkehrs- und Tarifverbund Stuttgart.

References

External links

  (in German)

Ludwigsburg (district)
Populated places on the Neckar basin
Populated riverside places in Germany
Württemberg